Dyadic describes the interaction between two things, and may refer to:

Dyad (sociology), interaction between a pair of individuals
The dyadic variation of Democratic peace theory
Dyadic counterpoint, the voice-against-voice conception of polyphony
People who are not intersex (see also endosex)

Mathematics
Dyadic, a relation or function having an arity of two in logic, mathematics, and computer science
Dyadic decomposition, a concept in Littlewood–Paley theory
Dyadic distribution, a type of probability distribution
Dyadic fraction, a mathematical group related to dyadic rationals
Dyadic solenoid, a type of dyadic fraction
Dyadic transformation
Dyadics, tensor math (including dyadic products)
A synonym for binary relations

See also
Dyad (disambiguation)